The Austrian Federal Railways (formally  (lit. The ÖBB group is owned entirely by the Republic of Austria, and is divided into several separate businesses that manage the infrastructure and operate passenger and freight services.

The Austrian Federal Railways has had two discrete periods of existence. It was first formed in 1923, using the Bundesbahn Österreich name, as a successor to the Imperial Royal Austrian State Railways (kkStB), but was incorporated into the Deutsche Reichsbahn during the 1938–1945 Anschluss. It was reformed in 1947, under the slightly different name Österreichische Bundesbahnen, and remains in existence in this form.

Major changes currently being made to the Austrian railway network are the construction of the Koralm Railway, the Semmering Base Tunnel and the Brenner Base Tunnel connection with Italy.

Eurobarometer surveys conducted in 2018 showed that satisfaction levels of Austrian rail passengers are among the highest in the European Union when it comes to punctuality, reliability and frequency of trains. Furthermore, with their NightJet brand, ÖBB operates Europe's largest night train fleet.

Unlike other major railway companies in Europe that offer more flexible cancellation policies, ÖBB only offers two types of tickets: full-price tickets, and cheaper but non-exchangeable and non-refundable tickets.

History

1882 – Gradual nationalisation of the railway network of the Austro-Hungarian Empire into the Imperial Royal Austrian State Railways (Kaiserlich-königliche österreichische Staatsbahnen, kkStB). By the outbreak of the World War I, the only major railway in Austria to remain in private hands was the Austrian Southern Railway (Südbahn).
 1918 – After the break-up of the Austro-Hungarian Empire following the World War I, the Austrian rump of kkStB remained in state control under the name Deutschösterreichische Staatsbahnen (DÖStB), which was renamed the Österreichische Staatsbahnen (ÖStB) in 1919.
 1923 – Foundation of the independent, commercial enterprise, the Bundesbahn Österreich (which used the abbreviation BBÖ, because ÖBB was already taken by the Swiss Oensingen-Balsthal-Bahn). This company took over the assets of the ÖStB and the Südbahn, together with other minor railways. 
 1938 – The Anschluss of Austria into the German Empire. The BBÖ was taken over by the Deutsche Reichsbahn. During World War II  about 41% of the Austrian railway network was destroyed.
 1947 – The company was reformed using the slightly different name of Österreichische Bundesbahnen and the abbreviation ÖBB (by that time the Swiss private railway used the abbreviation SP for its goods wagons in international traffic, so its abbreviation ÖBB could now be appropriated) as a state-owned company. Their infrastructure was rebuilt and electrification was accelerated.
 1969 – A new federal railway law was enacted. The ÖBB became a non-independent, economic entity, that was run as a branch of the government's industrial programme and remained entirely within the Federal budget.
 1992 – The ÖBB were broken out of the federal budget and turned into company with its own legal status (a cross between a GmbH and an AG in Austrian commercial terms). The company is 100% owned by the Republic of Austria. This change had two primary aims: 1. It had to conform to EU rules on the admission of Austria into the European Union. 2. The financial demand on the public purse was to be reduced as a result of improvements in efficiency and the pressure of competition.
 2004 – The ÖBB were reorganised into ÖBB Holding AG and a number of operating subsidiaries. The holding company was to oversee the operations of the companies assigned to it, coordinate a coherent strategic approach and allocate tasks for the whole enterprise.
 1 January 2005 – The subsidiaries of ÖBB-Holding AG became autonomous and independent operationally. 
 In 2012, ÖBB celebrated the 175th anniversary of the Nordbahn, the earliest predecessor company marking the start of rail transport in Austria. ÖBB CEO Christian Kern inaugurated an exhibition on the company's collaboration with Nazi Germany, named "The Suppressed Years – Railway and National Socialism in Austria 1938–1945". He referred to that period as "the darkest chapter of our company history," adding that the company must accept this period as part of its legacy. The exhibition later went on tour and was presented at the European Parliament's parliamentary building in Brussels.

The Austrian rail system is largely electrified. Electrification of the system began in 1912 but did not reach an advanced state until the 1950s. The last steam locomotive in regular service on the standard gauge network was retired in 1978.

The post-war laws related to the Austrian railways were the:
 Eisenbahngesetz (EisbG 1957),
 Schieneninfrastrukturfinanzierungsgesetz (SCHIG 1999),
 Eisenbahnhochleistungsstreckengesetz (HIG 1999) and
 Bundesbahngesetz (1992).

Logo history

Current structure 

By a law of August 2009, the organisational structure dating from 2005 was further modified; the railways are under the control of ÖBB-Holding AG, a holding company wholly owned by the Austrian state, under the Ministry of Transport.:

The holding company has a number of subsidiaries:

 ÖBB-Holding AG
 ÖBB-Personenverkehr AG (Passenger transport)
 ÖBB-Postbus GmbH
 ÖBB-Produktion GmbH (50% shares)
 ÖBB-Technische Services GmbH (75% shares) (railroad vehicle maintenance)
 Rail Tours Touristik GmbH
  GmbH (mobile app developer)
 ÖV Ticketshop GmbH (online ticket distributor)
 Rail Cargo Austria AG (RCA) (Freight transport)
 Rail Cargo Hungaria Zrt.
 ÖBB-Produktion GmbH (50% shares)
 ÖBB-Technische Services GmbH (25% shares)
 Rail Cargo Logistics – Austria GmbH
 Rail Cargo Carrier Kft.
 Rail Cargo Operator - CSKD s.r.o
 ÖBB-Infrastruktur AG (Infrastructure planning, management, and construction)
 ÖBB-Immobilienmanagement GmbH
 Mungos Sicher & Sauber GmbH (Security and Cleaning)
 Rail Equipment GmbH
 WS Service GmbH (51% shares)
 Brenner Basistunnel BBT SE (50% shares)
 Weichenwerk Wörth GmbH (43.05% shares)
 ÖBB-Business Competence Center GmbH ÖBB-Werbung GmbH ÖBB-Finanzierungsservice GmbH''

Infrastructure
The infrastructure of the state-owned Austrian network is managed by ÖBB-Infrastruktur AG, which was formed from former infrastructure-related units including Brenner Eisenbahn GmbH. It now manages 9,740 km of track, 788 signal boxes,  247 tunnels, 6,207 bridges and eight hydro-electric power (hep) stations for the 16.7 Hz electrification system, and two hep stations for 50 Hz power generation.

As of 2009 it employed 17,612 staff.

Statistics
According to the Annual Report 2013, the company employs 39,513, there of 13,599 employees, 24,251 tenured employees  and 1,663 apprentices. In 2013, ÖBB-Personenverkehr AG carried 469 million passengers of which 235 million were bus passengers.
The ÖBB has

4,859 km (3,020 route miles); 72% electrified
1,128 train stations
1,093 locomotives
2,799 passenger vehicles
26,518 freight wagons
2,200 busses

Principal Lines
 Western Railway from Wien Westbahnhof via St. Pölten Hauptbahnhof and Linz Hauptbahnhof to Salzburg Hauptbahnhof, including a parallel high-speed rail section ("New Western Railway") from Wien Meidling railway station to Linz
 Southern Railway from Wien Hauptbahnhof/Wien Meidling to Graz Hauptbahnhof, including the Semmering railway section – a UNESCO World Heritage Site
 continuation to Klagenfurt by the Koralm Railway (under construction)
 Northern Railway from Wien Praterstern railway station to Břeclav, Czech Republic
 Eastern Railway from Vienna Hauptbahnhof (under construction) to Hegyeshalom, Hungary and Budapest Keleti railway station
 Emperor Franz Joseph Railway from Wien Franz-Josefs-Bahnhof to Gmünd, Lower Austria and České Velenice, Czech Republic
 Salzburg-Tyrol Railway from Salzburg Hauptbahnhof to Wörgl Hauptbahnhof
 Enns Valley Railway from the Salzburg-Tyrol Railway at Bischofshofen to Selzthal
 Tauern Railway from the Salzburg-Tyrol Railway at Schwarzach/Sankt Veit to Spittal an der Drau via the Tauern Railway Tunnel
 Lower Inn Valley Railway from the German border near Kufstein railway station via Wörgl Hauptbahnhof to Innsbruck Hauptbahnhof; to be relieved by the New Lower Inn Valley railway line (under construction), part of the Trans-European Berlin–Palermo railway axis
 western continuation by the Arlberg Railway to Bludenz railway station via the Arlberg Railway Tunnel
 northwestern continuation by  the Mittenwald Railway to Garmisch-Partenkirchen, Germany and the Ausserfern Railway to Kempten Hauptbahnhof
 southern continuation by the Brenner Railway to Bozen, Italy and Verona via the Innsbruck bypass and the Brenner Pass, to be replaced by the Brenner Base Tunnel (planned)

Rail links to adjacent countries
All neighbouring railways have the same gauge.
 Czech Republic  — voltage and frequency change to 25 kV 50 Hz AC
 Germany  —  same voltage and frequency 15 kV 16.7 Hz AC
 Hungary  — voltage and frequency change to 25 kV 50 Hz AC
 Italy — voltage and frequency change to 3 kV DC
 Liechtenstein  —  same voltage and frequency 15 kV 16.7 Hz AC
 Slovakia  — voltage and frequency change to 25 kV 50 Hz AC
 Slovenia — voltage and frequency change to 3 kV DC
 Switzerland  —  same voltage and frequency 15 kV 16.7 Hz AC

Active Rolling Stock

Electric Locomotives

Diesel Locomotives

Electrical multiple units

Diesel Railcars

Maintenance of way equipment

See also

 Rail transport in Austria
 History of rail transport in Austria
 Imperial Austrian State Railways
 ÖBB Rolling Stock
 Rail transport in Liechtenstein – operated by ÖBB
 Railjet – the high-speed service of the ÖBB
 Transport in Austria

Other railways in Austria

 Achenseebahn
 Pöstlingbergbahn
 Raaberbahn
 Schafbergbahn
 Schneebergbahn
 Zillertalbahn

References

External links

 Official website
 International relations UIC
 International relations CER
 report of audit court 2006 
 modification of railroad law 2004
 passenger traffic tariffs of ÖBB in 2008
 , illustrated account of Austrian railways in the 1930s.
 

 
Railway companies of Austria
Railway companies established in 1923
Railteam
1923 establishments in Austria
Austrian brands
Rail transport in Liechtenstein